Nabataean Aramaic is the Aramaic variety used in inscriptions by the Nabataeans of the East Bank of the Jordan River, the Negev, and the Sinai Peninsula. Compared with other varieties of Aramaic, it is notable for the occurrence of a number of loanwords and grammatical borrowings from Arabic or other North Arabian languages. Attested in several dozen longer dedicatory and funerary inscriptions and a few legal documents from the period of the Nabataean Kingdom, Nabataean Aramaic remained in use for several centuries after the kingdom's annexation by the Roman Empire in 106 AD. Over time, the distinctive Nabataean script was increasingly used to write texts in the Arabic language. As a result, its latest stage gave rise to the earliest form of the Arabic script.

The phonology of Nabataean Aramaic can only be reconstructed in part, based on the mostly consonantal Nabataean script and comparison with other kinds of Aramaic. Similarly, its morphology and syntax are incompletely attested, but mostly comparable to other varieties of Aramaic from this period. The Nabataean lexicon is also largely Aramaic in origin, with notable borrowings from Arabic, Greek, and other languages.

History

Origin and linguistic classification
With the collapse of the Achaemenid Empire (330 BC), the Aramaic language increasingly lost importance as the lingua franca of the Near East. The Greek language now appeared beside it. The formerly-unified written culture fell apart into local schools and the old dialects now also increased in importance as written languages. Nabataean Aramaic was one of these local varieties. The language of the Nabataean inscriptions, attested from the 2nd century BC, is close to Achaemenid Official Aramaic, but with local developments. Of the few innovations compared to Imperial Aramaic, the use of the object marker yt is a Western Aramaic feature, although the older form ʔyt already occurs in Old Aramaic. As Nabataean Aramaic does not participate in the innovations typical of Eastern Aramaic, it is commonly assigned to Western Aramaic.

Attestation

Evidence of Nabataean writings can be found in the burial and dedication inscriptions of the cities of Petra, Bosra and Hegra (Mada'in Salih). Many shorter inscriptions have been found in the southern Sinai Peninsula as well as other areas that were at one point ruled by the Nabataean kings. Several Nabataean texts written on papyrus were found at Nahal Hever.

The oldest Nabataean inscription was found in Elusa, in the Negev. The inscription mentions "Aretas, king of the Nabataeans", interpreted as Aretas I, an Arab ruler with whom the Jewish high priest Jason reputedly sought refuge in Petra in 169 BC.  argues that this inscription lacks some of the Nabataean features and resembles uniform Imperial Aramaic and Jewish script. Therefore, some scholars propose that the earliest Nabataean inscription is one found in Petra, Jordan, which can be dated back to the late Hellenistic era in the years 96 or 95 BC.

Over 4000 excavated inscriptions have been confirmed to be written in Nabataean Aramaic. Most of the Nabataean inscriptions found are either burial designations or formal designations. The earliest inscription found to be written in cursive Nabataean was unearthed in Horvat Raqiq, close to the city of Beersheba, Israel. This inscription is unique not only because of its age, but also because it was written using ink applied on a large rock. Similarly cursive texts written with ink on papyrus were found as part of the Babatha archive.

The vast majority of Nabataean inscriptions are found engraved on stone, like the Aslah Triclinium inscription from Petra (95 BC), the dedication to the goddess al-Kutbay from Wadi Tumilat (77 BC) and the inscription of Rabbel I from Petra (66 BC). Some excavations have unearthed inscriptions on metallic objects. Most of such inscriptions were inscribed on metallic coins. Excavations in Wadi Musa in southern Jordan unearthed dozens of bronze fragments with Nabataean inscriptions on them, yet the source of these fragments is uncertain. A bronze oil burner excavated in Wadi Musa attests a well-preserved dedication from a priest and his son to Obodas, which dates to the reign of the Nabataean king Rabbel II Soter, who ruled between the years 70 and 106 AD.

Decline

From the period of its earliest attestation, Nabataean Aramaic is notable for the use of Arabic or Ancient North Arabian loanwords and grammar, reflecting strong contact with these languages. A first- or second-century AD Nabataean inscription from Ein Avdat even contains three lines of Arabic poetry, of debated meaning. From the 3rd century onwards, the Nabataean script was increasingly used to write the Arabic language. Prominent examples include the mixed Aramaic-Arabic epitaph of RQWŠ daughter of ʕBDMWNTW (JSNab 17) and the entirely Arabic Namara inscription. 

According to Cantineau, this marked the beginning of the end of the widespread use of Nabataean Aramaic, which came to be replaced by Arabic. During this process, "Nabataean seems to have emptied itself little by little of the Aramaic elements it had and to have successively replaced them with Arabic loans". This theory, while widely acknowledged, is contested. M. O'Connor argues that while Cantineau's theory may be historically true, his method of research to reach such conclusion is lacking, and may be misguided.

Nabataean Aramaic continued to be written for several centuries during this rise of Arabic written in the Nabataean script. The longer texts from this period mainly concern a few funerary inscriptions from North Arabian oasis towns. Based on the high number of Hebrew-derived names these contain, they may have been commissioned by members of local Jewish communities. The latest Nabataean inscription found dates back to 356 AD. This was found in Mada'in Salih, in the north of what is now Saudi Arabia. An even later graffito, dated to 455/6 AD and written in Nabataeo-Arabic characters, was discovered in 2004 at Jabal Umm Jadhayidh in north-western Saudi Arabia, but its Aramaic content is limited to stock formulas, the non-formulaic text being entirely Arabic.

Decipherment, documentation and description

The existence of thousands of Nabataean graffiti in the Sinai desert, originally referred to as "Sinaitic", had long been known. Based on Jean-Jacques Barthélemy's earlier decipherment of the related scripts of Palmyrene, Phoenician, and Imperial Aramaic as represented on the Carpentras Stele,  published his reading of the Nabataean script in 1840. 

Texts of various length continued to be discovered and published by European scholars during the 19th and 20th century. This period also saw the publication of Jean Cantineau's grammar of Nabataean Aramaic and lexicon with sample texts. Important finds after this publication include the legal documents written on papyrus discovered in the Nahal Hever Cave of Letters in the 1960s. Other publications containing a significant number of texts are the 1993 edition of the tomb inscriptions of Mada'in Saleh by J. Healey and the collection of Nabatean Aramaic–Greek bilingual texts published by G. Petrantoni in 2021. Newly discovered inscriptions continue to be published with great frequency.

Script
 
Nabataean handwriting is characterized by a very characteristic cursive style. This is even more true for the few known texts that were written with ink, which use a more advanced form of the script. The Nabataean alphabet itself developed out of the Aramaic alphabet. It became the precursor of the Arabic alphabet, which developed out of cursive variants of the Nabataean script in the 5th century.

Scholars used to be divided over the origins of Arabic script. One (contemporarily marginal) school of thought derives the Arabic script from the Syriac script, which also originated in Aramaic. The second school of thought, led by Theodor Nöldeke, traces Arabic script to Nabataean. This thesis was confirmed and fully documented by J. Healey in his work on the Syriac and the Arabic alphabet.

Phonology

Consonants 
According to Cantineau, Nabataean Aramaic had the following consonantal sounds:

In other contemporary dialects of Aramaic, [f], [θ], [x], [v], [ð], and [ɣ] are postvocalic allophones of /p/, /t/, /k/, /b/, /d/, and /g/, respectively, but Cantineau notes that it cannot be established whether this also holds for Nabataean. The voiceless sibilants /s/ and /ʃ/ are sometimes confused in writing. /s/ also interchanges with /ɬ/, which was written with the same sign as /ʃ/ (a practice dating back to the Ancient Aramaic period). Cantineau is unsure of the phonetic value of this sound and suggests it may have been palatalized; the realization as a lateral fricative is argued in later scholarship. The evidence for the preservation of the uvular fricatives /χ/ and /ʁ/ or their merger with pharyngeal /ħ/ and /ʕ/ as in later Aramaic is inconclusive.

Vowels
As the Nabataean script does not indicate short vowels, the only information comes from names in foreign transcription. But these are normally of Arabic origin and do not tell us anything about the vocalic phonemes of Nabataean Aramaic.

Proto-Aramaic long *ā is sometimes spelled with a mater lectionis w, as in *ʔināš > ʔnwš 'human', *θamānā > tmwnʔ 'eight (m.)'. This may indicate a shift in pronunciation to a rounded ō.

Morphology

Pronouns

Personal pronouns
The attested third person independent personal pronouns are masculine singular hw (rarely hwʔ), feminine singular hy, and masculine plural hm. The third person independent pronouns also function as demonstrative pronouns. The legal documents found in the Dead Sea region also attest the first person singular ʔnh and second person masculine singular ʔnt.

The first person plural suffixed pronoun is -nʔ. Unlike many other dialects of Aramaic which simply have -(a)n, Nabataean preserves the final vowel *-ā here, as indicated by the mater lectionis ʔ.

The third person masculine singular suffixed pronoun is normally -h. After long vowels and diphthongs (both marked by matres lectionis), -hy is used instead, as in ʔbwhy 'his father', ywmwhy 'his days'. In later graffiti, this distribution breaks down and other suffixes, -hw and -w, also appear. The third person feminine singular suffixed pronoun is always -h and the third person plural (used both for masculine and feminine) is -hm.

Other pronouns
The most common demonstrative pronouns besides hw, hy, and hm are masculine singular dnh (rarely znh), feminine singular dʔ, and plural ʔlh. Other, rarely attested plural forms are ʔlk and ʔnw. In the later period, the gender distinction in the singular breaks down and both forms occur with both masculine and feminine antecedents.

The relative particle is zy in the oldest inscriptions and dy elsewhere. It does not inflect. It introduces relative clauses, as in dʔ msgdʔ dy ʕbd ʕbydw 'this is the sacred stone which ʕBYDW made', and can express a genitive relation, as in dnʔ ṣlmʔ dy ʕbdt ʔlhʔ 'this is the statue of Obodas the god'.

The interrogative and indefinite pronouns are mn 'who' and mh 'what'.

Verbs

Verb stems 

Like other Semitic languages, Nabataean Aramaic attests various (basic and derived) verb stems. Based on comparison with other varieties of Aramaic, it is likely that active verbs could occur as G-stems (basic stem), D-stems (intensive stem, characterized by different vowels and gemination of the second radical), or C-stems (causative stem, characterized by different vowels and a prefix). Due to the limitations of the Nabataean alphabet, the G- and D-stem are not distinguished in writing: cf. ʕbd 'he made' (G-stem), qrb 'he approached' (D-stem). The suffix conjugation (see below) of the C-stem is marked by a prefixed h-, as in hqym 'he erected', or ʔ-, as in ʔqymw 'they erected'; the prefix conjugation cannot be distinguished in writing from the G- or D-stem.

Mediopassive stems derived from the G- and D-stems are attested. These are marked by a prefixed -t-; all the examples known to Cantineau are prefix conjugation forms (see below), such as ytptḥ 'it will be opened' (tG-stem), ytʔlp 'he will compose for himself' (tD-stem). Unlike in some other kinds of Aramaic, verbs with a sibilant first radical prefix the -t- or infix it without voicing or emphatic assimilation: ytzbn and yztbn 'it will be sold'; these kinds of forms also occur in contemporary texts from the Dead Sea region, however. The late form mqtry (for earlier mtqrʔ) 'called (m.sg.)' shows Arabic-like infixation of -t- after a non-sibilant first radical, although the form cannot have been borrowed from Arabic in its entirety.

A purely passive form is marked by a mater lectionis -y- between the second and third radical, as in dkyr 'remembered (be) (m.sg.)'. This is sometimes inflected as an adjective, as in dkyryn 'remembered (m.pl.)' but can also be inflected according to the suffix conjugation, as in ʕbydt 'it (f.) was made'.

Verbal inflection 
Two finite conjugations can be distinguished: the suffix conjugation, which exclusively marks its subject agreement through suffixation, and the prefix conjugation, which uses both suffixes and prefixes. Attested suffix conjugation endings include -t (third person feminine singular and second person masculine singular) and -w (third person plural for both genders); the third person masculine singular is unmarked. Examples include ʕbd 'he made', ʕbdt 'she made', ʕbdw 'they made', and qrʔt 'you (m.sg.) called'. The subject markers for the third person prefix conjugation are y- (third person masculine singular), t- (third person feminine singular), and y-...-wn (third person (masculine?) plural), as in yʕbd 'he will make', tʕbd 'she will make', and yktbwn 'they will write'.

The G-stem infinitive is formed with a prefixed m-, as in mktb 'to write'. The G-stem active participle does not have any special affixes and has a stem like rḥm 'loving (m.sg.)'. As noted above, the G-stem passive participle is formed like dkyr 'remembered (m.sg.)'. In late graffiti, the form mdk(w)r 'remembered (m.sg.)' also occurs, a pattern which is borrowed from Arabic. The participles (both active and passive) of the derived stems are formed by prefixing an m-, but examples are scarce.

Nouns 

Nouns distinguish two genders, masculine and feminine; two numbers, singular and plural; and three states, absolute, construct, and emphatic.

Feminine nouns may be marked by a feminine suffix (-h, -w, -y) or unmarked. The masculine is always unmarked.

Various endings express the combination of number and state:

 The feminine suffix -h is replaced by -t in the construct state, which expresses possession by a following noun or suffixed pronoun. -t is also added in the construct state after the feminine suffixes -w and -y. In other cases, the construct is identical to the absolute state in the singular.
 One set of plural endings consists of absolute -yn (rarely -n), construct -y (which changes to -w- before the suffix -hy), used for masculine and some feminine nouns. For other feminine nouns, the construct plural form is written the same as the construct singular form (although the plural was probably marked by a long ā vowel, as in -āt-, that was absent in the singular; this is not expressed in the writing); based on other varieties of Aramaic, the expected absolute suffix for these nouns is -n, but this is unattested.
 The emphatic state, expressing definiteness, is formed by adding the suffix -ʔ to the construct state.

The full paradigm is thus (example forms are of mlk 'king' and mlkh 'queen'; not all forms are actually attested):

Prepositions 

Frequent prepositions include b- 'in', l- 'to, for, of', k- 'according to', mn 'from', and ʕl 'on, about'. These can take pronominal suffixes, as in bh 'in it', lhm 'to them'. ʕl is inflected as a plural before suffixes, as in ʕlwhy over him, ʕlyhm 'over them'.

Syntax 

Cantineau remarks the following about Nabataean Aramaic syntax:

Verbal syntax 

Of the two finite verb conjugations, the suffix conjugation has the following uses:

 past tense, as in dnh kprʔ dy ʕbd ... 'this is the grave which ... made'
 optative, as in wlʕnw dwšrʔ wmnwtw wqyšh ... 'and may Dushara and Manat and Qayshah curse ...'

The prefix conjugation has the following uses:

 future tense, as in wmn ybʕʔ ... 'and whoever shall want ...'
 subjunctive, as in  ... dy tʕbd bh ... '... so that she make of it ...'
 conditional, as in hn yhwʔ ... bḥgrʔ 'if ... be in Hegra'
 optative, like the suffix conjugation, as in wylʕn dwšrʔ wmnwtw ... 'and may Dushara and Manat curse ...'

While the pronominal direct object of a verb is rarely expressed by a suffixed pronoun attached to the verb, normally it is attached to the following object marker yt.

Verbal and non-verbal clauses 

If a sentence includes a verb, the normal word order is verb—subject—object(s), as in lʕnw (V) dwšrʔ wmnwtw wqyšh (S) kl mn dy ... (O) 'may Dushara and Manat and Qayshah curse anyone who ...'.

If a sentence does not include a verb, it is copular. It then consists of two noun phrases which make up the subject and predicate, as in dnh (S) kprʔ ... (P) 'this is the grave ...'.

Coordination and subordination 

Clauses can be coordinated by the conjunction w- 'and, but'. Most forms of subordinate clauses are introduced by the particle dy. Conditional clauses are introduced by hn 'if'.

Lexicon 

Most of the Nabataean basic vocabulary has been inherited from older Aramaic. Examples of these inherited words include ʔb 'father', ʔm 'mother', br 'son', brt 'daughter', dkr 'male', and nqbh 'female'. Loanwords, however, are also common. Arabic and Ancient North Arabian loanwords have received special attention. Words like ʔṣdq 'heir' and kpr 'tomb' may have been borrowed from Dadanitic. Words thought to have been borrowed from Arabic include ḥlyqh 'custom' (Arabic ḫalīqah), lʕn 'to curse' (Arabic laʕana), and ʕyr 'other than' (Arabic ġayr). The Nabataean kingdom's contacts with Hellenistic states and Rome also led to the borrowing of certain Greek words, such as ʔsrtg 'general' (Greek stratēgós). Some of these ultimately come from Latin, like qysr 'Caesar'. From earlier stages of Aramaic, Nabataean inherited a few loanwords from Akkadian: the attested borrowings are ʔpkl (a kind of priest; Akkadian apkallu, ultimately from Sumerian abgal) and šyzb 'to save' (Akkadian šūzubu).

Sample texts

Nabataean period

Roman period

See also
 Nabataean kingdom
 Nabataean Arabic
 Nabataean script
 Aramaic
 Palmyrene Aramaic
 Arabic
 Old Arabic
 Ancient North Arabian
 Semitic languages

References

Sources
 

 

 

 

 

 

 

 

 

 

 

 

 

Further reading
 al-Hamad, Muntasir. "Nabataean Syntax, with Special Reference to Other Aramaic Dialects and Arabic". Ph.D. thesis, University of Manchester, 2005.
 al-Khraysheh, Fawwaz. Die Personennamen in den nabatäischen Inschriften des Corpus Inscriptionum Semiticarum. Marburg, 1986. In German
 Cantineau, J. Le Nabatéen. 2 vols. Paris: Librairie Ernest Leroux, 1930–1932. In French
 Euting, Julius. Nabatäische Inschriften aus Arabien. Berlin, 1885. In German
 Hackl, Ursula/Jenni, Hanna/Schneider, Christoph. Quellen zur Geschichte der Nabatäer. NTOA 51. Fribourg, 2003. . In German
 Levinson, Jay. "The Nabatean Aramaic Inscriptions". Ph.D. thesis, New York University, 1974.

Aramaic languages
Arabic language
Nabataea
Languages attested from the 2nd century BC
Wadi Tumilat